Atyk (Ätek) is a rural locality (a village) in Bishkurayevsky Selsoviet, Tuymazinsky District, Bashkortostan, Russia. The population was 37 as of 2010. There is 1 street.

Geography 
Atyk is located 53 km east of Tuymazy (the district's administrative centre) by road. Yulduzly is the nearest rural locality.

References 

Rural localities in Tuymazinsky District